In computing, redirection is a form of interprocess communication, and is a function common to most command-line interpreters, including the various Unix shells that can redirect standard streams to user-specified locations.

Redirecting standard input and standard output
Redirection is usually implemented by placing certain characters between commands.

Basic

Variants
To append output to the end of the file, rather than clobbering it, the >> operator is used: command1 >> file1.

To read from a stream literal (an inline file, passed to the standard input), one can use a here document, using the << operator:
$ tr a-z A-Z << END_TEXT
> one two three
> uno dos tres
> END_TEXT
ONE TWO THREE
UNO DOS TRES

To read from a string, one can use a here string, using the <<< operator: tr a-z A-Z <<< "one two three", or:

$ NUMBERS="one two three"
$ tr a-z A-Z <<< "$NUMBERS"
ONE TWO THREE

Piping

The two programs performing the commands may run in parallel with the only storage space being working buffers (Linux allows up to 64K for each buffer) plus whatever work space each command's processing requires. For example, a "sort" command is unable to produce any output until all input records have been read, as the very last record received just might turn out to be first in sorted order. Dr. Alexia Massalin's experimental operating system, Synthesis, would adjust the priority of each task as they ran according to the fullness of their input and output buffers.

This produces the same end result as using two redirects and a temporary file, as in:

$ command1 > tempfile
$ command2 < tempfile
$ rm tempfile

But here,  does not start executing until  has finished, and a sufficiently large scratch file is required to hold the intermediate results as well as whatever work space each task required. As an example, although DOS allows the "pipe" syntax, it employs this second approach. Thus, suppose some long-running program "Worker" produces various messages as it works, and that a second program, TimeStamp copies each record from stdin to stdout, prefixed by the system's date and time when the record is received. A sequence such as Worker | TimeStamp > LogFile.txt would produce timestamps only when Worker had finished, merely showing how swiftly its output file could be read and written.

A good example for command piping is combining echo with another command to achieve something interactive in a non-interactive shell, e.g. echo -e 'user\npass' | ftp localhost. This runs the ftp client with input , press , then .

In casual use, the initial step of a pipeline is often cat or echo, reading from a file or string. This can often be replaced by input indirection or a here string, and use of cat and piping rather than input redirection is known as useless use of cat. For example, the following commands:
$ cat infile | command
$ echo $string | command
$ echo -e 'user\npass' | ftp localhost
can be replaced by:
$ command < infile
$ command <<< $string
$ ftp localhost <<< $'user\npass'
As echo is often a shell-internal command, its use is not as criticized as cat, which is an external command.

Redirecting to and from the standard file handles
In Unix shells derived from the original Bourne shell, the first two actions can be further modified by placing a number (the file descriptor) immediately before the character; this will affect which stream is used for the redirection. The Unix standard I/O streams are:

The reason for this is to distinguish between a file named '1' and stdout, i.e.  vs . In the first case, stderr is redirected to a file named '' and in the second, stderr is redirected to stdout.

Another useful capability is to redirect one standard file handle to another. The most popular variation is to merge standard error into standard output so error messages can be processed together with (or alternately to) the usual output. For example,  will try to find all files named . Executed without redirection, it will output hits to stdout and errors (e.g. for lack of privilege to traverse protected directories) to stderr. If standard output is directed to file , error messages appear on the console. To see both hits and error messages in file , merge stderr (handle 2) into stdout (handle 1) using .

If the merged output is to be piped into another program, the file merge sequence  must precede the pipe symbol, thus, 

It is possible to use 2>&1 before ">" but the result is commonly misunderstood.
The rule is that any redirection sets the handle to the output stream independently.
So "2>&1" sets handle 2 to whatever handle 1 points to, which at that point usually is stdout.
Then ">" redirects handle 1 to something else, e.g. a file, but it does not change handle 2, which still points to stdout.

In the following example, standard output is written to file, but errors are redirected from stderr to stdout, i.e. sent to the screen: .

To write both errors and standard output to file, the order should be reversed. Standard output would first be redirected to the file, then stderr would additionally be redirected to the stdout handle that has already been changed to point at the file: .

Chained pipelines
The redirection and piping tokens can be chained together to create complex commands. This type of construction is used very commonly in shell scripts and batch files.

Redirect to multiple outputs
The standard command  can redirect output from a command to several destinations:ls -lrt | tee xyz. This directs the file list output to both standard output and the file .

See also
Here-document, a way of specifying text for input in command-line shells
Shell shoveling
Command substitution
Process substitution

External links

Redirection Definition by The Linux Information Project (LINFO)
I/O Redirection in The Linux Documentation Project
Redirection in Windows
Creating a Child Process with Redirected Input and Output in Windows

Articles with example code
DOS technology
Unix software
Unix
Windows administration

pl:Standardowe strumienie